Lower Deeside is one of the thirteen wards used to elect members of the Aberdeen City Council. It elects three Councillors.

Councillors

Election results

2022 election

2017 election
2017 Aberdeen City Council election

2012 election
2012 Aberdeen City Council election

2007 election
2007 Aberdeen City Council election

References

Wards of Aberdeen